RMS Douro was a British passenger liner that served from 1865 to 1882 with the Royal Mail Steam Packet Company. She was sunk in a collision in 1882.

Construction and career
Douro was an iron-hulled steamship built in 1865 by Caird & Company at Greenock, Scotland. She had eight watertight compartments. She could accommodate 253 first-class, 30 second-class, and 30 third-class passengers and had a crew of 80. She had lavish accommodations, and during her career developed a reputation for speed and reliability, with good food and music for her passengers.

Douro entered service in 1865, initially serving routes between the United Kingdom and the West Indies. Early in her career, she was running mates with  until Rhone sank in 1867.

In 1869, Douro switched to South American service on the Southampton, England-Buenos Aires, Argentina, route. As a Royal Mail Ship, she carried mail and newspapers under contract. She also often carried precious cargo, including gold and diamonds.

Sinking

On 31 March 1882 Douro – bound from Buenos Aires to Southampton with stops at Brazil and Lisbon, Portugal – was running 90 minutes behind schedule when she departed Lisbon bound for Southampton on the final leg of the voyage. In order to make up time, she proceeded at full speed northward off the Portuguese and Spanish coasts.

On the evening of 1 April, Douro passed Spain′s Cape Finisterre under a full moon. Her fourth officer noticed the Spanish steamer  about two nautical miles ( away, but assumed that the officer on the bridge had also spotted her and did not pass word of the sighting to him. The officer on the bridge only sighted Yrurac Bat later, when it was too late to avoid a collision, and at 22:45 hours on 1 April Yrurac Bat rammed Douro. Yrurac Bat′s bow cut two deep gashes in Douro′s starboard side. There were six fatalities among those aboard Douro, her captain, Ebenezer C. Kemp, and five other officers who went down with the ship, but the other 32 members of her crew and all 112 of her passengers survived. Yrurac Bat sank soon after Douro with the loss of another 53 lives. The survivors were rescued soon after the disaster by the British Hull-registered steamer , which took them to A Coruña, Spain.

References

External links 
 RMS Douro at Wrecksite.eu
 The Unfortunate Tragedy of The RMS Douro

1864 ships
Ships built on the River Clyde
Ships of the Royal Mail Steam Packet Company
Merchant ships of the United Kingdom
Maritime incidents in April 1882
Shipwrecks in the Atlantic Ocean
Ships sunk in collisions